Kicking is a skill used in many types of football, including:

 American football
Association football
 Australian rules football
 Canadian football
 Gaelic football
International rules football
 Rugby league
 Rugby union

Kicking is the act of propelling a ball by striking it with the foot or, depending upon the sport, the shin. Kicking is most common in Association Football, where only the two goalkeepers are allowed to use their hands.  It is also the primary method of transferring the ball in Australian rules football and Gaelic football.   Whereas most sports allow points to be scored by methods other than kicking, in Australian rules football kicking for goal is the only method allowed to score a goal and get the maximum six point score.  Kicking is used less frequently in Rugby League, Rugby Union, American football, and Canadian football, and may be restricted to specialist positions, but it is still an important tactical skill in each sport.

List of common kicking styles

The range of kicking styles available is typically influenced by the shape of the ball and the rules (whether hands can be used to carry or pick up the ball).

See also
Kick-to-kick

References 

Football
Articles containing video clips